The West Branch of the Warner River is a  river in central New Hampshire in the United States. It is a tributary of the Warner River, part of the Contoocook River (and ultimately Merrimack River) watershed.

The West Branch rises in the southwest corner of Newbury, New Hampshire, on the eastern slopes of Mount Sunapee. Flowing east, it quickly enters the town of Bradford, reaching the Warner River at the town center.

See also

List of rivers of New Hampshire

References

Tributaries of the Merrimack River
Rivers of New Hampshire
Rivers of Merrimack County, New Hampshire